Emmanuel Ndubuisi Okoye (born 4 April 1991) is a Nigerian footballer who plays as a winger.

Club career
Okoye started his career from Greek side Vyzas – in three years, he made a total of 77 league appearances and scored 19 goals for the club, all in the Football League 2. In July 2011, he moved to Panionios in the Superleague.

References

External links

1991 births
Living people
Association football wingers
Nigerian footballers
Vyzas F.C. players
Panionios F.C. players
Aris Limassol FC players
Pafos FC players
Akritas Chlorakas players
Gżira United F.C. players
Al-Arabi SC (Saudi Arabia) players
Super League Greece players
Cypriot First Division players
Cypriot Second Division players
Segunda División B players
Maltese Premier League players
Saudi Second Division players
Nigerian expatriate footballers
Nigerian expatriate sportspeople in Greece
Nigerian expatriate sportspeople in Cyprus
Nigerian expatriate sportspeople in Spain
Nigerian expatriate sportspeople in Saudi Arabia
Expatriate footballers in Greece
Expatriate footballers in Cyprus
Expatriate footballers in Spain
Expatriate footballers in Malta
Expatriate footballers in Saudi Arabia